, Japan is a professional Japanese baseball outfielder. He last played for the Chunichi Dragons.

On 22 October 2015, Watanabe was selected as the 6th draft pick for the Chunichi Dragons at the development player round of the 2015 NPB Draft and on 27 November signed a development player contract with a ¥2,000,000 moving allowance and a ¥3,000,000 yearly salary.

After performing well for the farm team over 3 seasons, Watanabe was upgraded to a fully rostered contract at the end of the 2018 NPB season being presented with the number 31.

References

External links
NPB.jp

1993 births
Living people
Baseball people from Kanagawa Prefecture
Japanese baseball players
Nippon Professional Baseball outfielders
Chunichi Dragons players